Ben Lewis (born 1966) is a British art critic, historian and documentary filmmaker.

Books
2019: The Last Leonardo: Secret Lives of the World’s Most Expensive Painting, a history and investigation of the Salvator Mundi painting attributed to Leonardo da Vinci
2008: Hammer & Tickle. The Communist Joke Book, Weidenfeld & NicolsonAlso published in Germany, Portugal, Poland, Slovenia and Italy

Documentaries
2017: The Beatles, Hippies and Hells Angels: Inside the Crazy World of Apple (unauthorized film; narrated by Peter Coyote)
2013: Google and the World Brain2009:The Great Contemporary Art Bubble, "explores the current international art market, from its heady peak to its inevitable crash", best feature documentary at the Foyle Film Festival
2006: Hammer & Tickle: The Communist Joke Book, a  documentary about Russian political jokes, best documentary at the Zurich Film Festival
2005:  Blowing Up Paradise, about French nuclear testing in the Pacific, Special Jury Prix at the FIFO (2008)
Since 2003: Art Safari series; Art Safari-1: films on Maurizio Cattelan, Gregor Schneider, Matthew Barney, and relational art (theories of  the French curator and art citic Nicolas Bourriaud)Art Safari-2: Wim Delvoye,  Sophie Calle, Takashi Murakami, and Santiago Sierra
Bronze prize at the New York Television Festival (2007), North Rhine-Westphalia Special Prize for Culture  ( NRW Sonderpreis Kultur) at the Adolf-Grimme-Preis (2007) "Grimme-Preis 2007 Art Safari (ZDF/ARTE)"
2001: The King of Communism: the pomp and pageantry Nicolae Ceausescu, Best Historical Documentary award from Grierson Awards (2002)
1999: The Lost Race'';  history of the National Front and its splinter groups

References

External links
 

1966 births
Living people
British historians
British art critics
British filmmakers